Meiogyne laddiana is a species of plant in the family Annonaceae, first described by Albert Charles Smith in 1936 as Polyalthia laddiana. It is endemic to Fiji.

References

laddiana
Endemic flora of Fiji
Plants described in 1936